Frank Stokes is an Australian former professional rugby league footballer who played in the 1990s. He played for Manly-Warringah in the NSWRL competition.

Playing career
Stokes was initially spotted as a 17-year old by Bob Fulton after a pre-season trip to Darwin. Stokes made his first grade debut for Manly in round 1 of the 1990 NSWRL season against Balmain where he started at fullback in a 14-12 victory at Leichhardt Oval. The following week, he scored his first try in the top grade against Newcastle at Brookvale Oval. In 1991, Stokes finished as Manly's top try scorer with twelve tries and played in both of the clubs finals games against North Sydney and Canberra. In his three remaining years at Manly, Stokes played mostly in reserve grade and was used as more of a back up player in the Manly squad. At the end of 1994, Stokes was released by Manly and he returned to Darwin.

References

Year of birth missing (living people)
Manly Warringah Sea Eagles players
Australian rugby league players
Rugby league fullbacks
Rugby league wingers
Living people